Axel Chapelle (born 24 April 1995) is a French pole vaulter.

Career
Chapelle was born in Colombes and began pole vaulting in 2005, at the age of 10. He won his first major medal at the 2013 European Athletics Junior Championships in Rieti, Italy, with a vault of 5.25 m.

At the 2014 World Junior Championships in Athletics in Eugene, Oregon, Chapelle won his first major gold medal, vaulting to a world junior leading height of 5.55 m. He broke into tears as he listened to La Marseillaise, the national anthem of France, after he received his gold medal on top of the podium at Hayward Field. He became only the second pole vaulter to win a junior world title for France since Jean Galfione in 1990.

Competition record

Personal life
Chapelle's older brother, Theo, is also a pole vaulter. They both train together at the EA Cergy Pontoise Athlétisme club in Paris and have equal personal bests of 5.55 m.

References

External links
 
 Axel Chapelle at FFA 

1995 births
Living people
Sportspeople from Colombes
Athletes from Paris
French male pole vaulters
20th-century French people
21st-century French people